The Australian Songwriters Hall of Fame was established in 2004 to honour the lifetime achievements of some of Australia's greatest songwriters. The award is presented annually at the Australian Songwriters Association Awards night by Glenn A Baker.

List of inductees

References

2004 establishments in Australia
Halls of fame in Australia
Music halls of fame